A heliport is a small airport suitable for use by helicopters and some other vertical lift aircraft. Designated heliports typically contain one or more touchdown and liftoff areas and may also have limited facilities such as fuel or hangars. In some larger towns and cities, customs facilities may also be available.

Early advocates of helicopters hoped that heliports would become widespread, but they have become contentious in urban areas due to the excessive noise caused by helicopter traffic.

In American use a heliport is defined as "an area of land, water, or structure used or intended to be used for the landing and takeoff of helicopters and includes its buildings and facilities if any." A heliport will consist of one or more helipads, which are defined as "a small, designated area, usually with a prepared surface, on a heliport, airport, landing/take-off area, apron/ramp, or movement area used for takeoff, landing, or parking of helicopters."

In Canada the term heliport is legally only used for a certified aerodrome for helicopter use.

Heliport airspace
The airspace immediately surrounding the heliport is called the Primary Surface. This area coincides in shape and size with the designated take-off and landing area. This surface is a horizontal plane equal to the elevation of the established heliport elevation. The Primary Surface is further broken down into three distinct regions. These are, the 'Touch-down and Lift-off' (TLOF) area, the 'Final Approach and Takeoff' (FATO) area and the 'Safety Area'. 

The TLOF is a load-bearing, generally paved area, normally centered in the FATO, on which the helicopter lands and / or takes off. The FATO is a defined area over which the pilot completes the final phase of the approach to a hover or a landing, and from which the pilot initiates take-off.  The FATO elevation is the lowest elevation of the edge of the TLOF. The Safety Area is a defined area on a heliport surrounding the FATO intended to reduce the risk of damage to helicopters accidentally diverging from the FATO.

Purpose
In a large metropolitan and urban areas, a heliport can serve passengers needing to quickly move within the city, or to outlying regions.  Generally, heliports can be situated closer to a town or city center than an airport for fixed-wing aircraft. The advantage in flying by helicopter to a destination, or even to the city's main airport, is that travel can be much faster than by surface transport. As an example, the Downtown Manhattan Heliport in New York City provides scheduled service to John F. Kennedy International Airport, and is used to move wealthy persons and important goods quickly to destinations as far away as Maryland.

Police departments use heliports as a base for police helicopters, and larger departments may have a dedicated large heliport facility dedicated such as the LAPD Hooper Heliport.

Some skyscrapers feature rooftop heliports to serve the transport needs of executives or clients. Many of these rooftop sites also serve as Emergency Helicopter Landing Facilities (EHLF), in case emergency evacuation is needed. The U.S. Bank Tower in Los Angeles is an example.

Helipads are common features at hospitals, where they serve to facilitate helicopter air ambulance and MEDEVACs for transferring patients into and out of hospital facilities.  Some large trauma centers may have multiple helipads, while most small hospitals have just one.  Helipads allow hospitals to accept patients flown in from remote accident sites, where there are no local hospitals or facilities capable of providing the level of emergency care required.

The National EMS Pilots Association (NEMSPA) has published multiple white papers, surveys and safety recommendations for the enhancement of hospital helipad operations to improve patient safety.

Heliport markings 
While heliports can be oriented in any direction, they will generally have very definitive approach and departure paths.  However, heliports are not numbered in the same way that runways at airports are.  Recommended standard practice by both the Federal Aviation Administration (FAA) and the International Civil Aviation Organization (ICAO) is to orient a H in the center of the TLOF, in line with the preferred approach / departure direction.

An information box should also be included in the TLOF area, which provides the aircraft gross weight the helipad is rated for, as well as the maximum size helicopter the helipad has been designed to accommodated, which is based on the helicopter rotor diameter and overall length of the largest design helicopter that will service the helipad.  Under normal conditions, it is standard practice to paint the maximum gross weight a helipad is designed to support in either metric tonnes, kilograms, or thousands of pounds, along with the maximum helicopter dimensions in metres or feet.  Arrows are oftentimes painted on the heliport to indicate to pilots the preferred approach / departure paths.  Other common markings can include ownership, radio frequencies, company logo(s), and magnetic north.

Lighting
To conduct night-time operations, a heliport must have lighting installed that meets specific aeronautical standards.  Heliport perimeter lights are generally installed around the TLOF area, and may be flush mounted on the TLOF itself, or mounted just off the TLOF perimeter on short metal or concrete extensions.

One alternative to lighting the TLOF if certain criteria are met, is to light the area of the FATO instead. Some locations, due to environmental conditions, illuminate the TLOF and FATO. Current standards recommend that all perimeter lighting be green. Prior standards recommended amber lighting for perimeter lights; however this wavelength has been shown to interfere with night vision goggle (NVG) operations, when used with older incandescent lighting.

In the past, lighting has been traditionally incandescent, but increasingly, light-emitting diodes (LEDs) are being incorporated, due to lower power requirements and increased life.  While flood lights may be used to enhance surface operations, they should not interfere with flight crew night vision, and should be kept off during flight operations, and only used when conducting ground movement operations.  To conduct night operations, a lighted wind cone is also required.  At ground-based heliports, lead-in lights may be incorporated to identify the preferred approach / departure direction.  Visual slope guidance systems (such as HAPI, PAPI, etc.) are recommended options in both ICAO and FAA document.  While airports commonly use 6.6A direct current power, heliport lighting is normally AC powered.  Radio control of the lighting by the pilot via an automated ground-based controller is also common.

Approach / departure airspace

To provide for a safe environment to perform normal helicopter landing and take-off operations, each heliport must have unobstructed approach / departure paths.

The minimum recommended separation between flight paths is 135 degrees. A heliport approach path is broken down into two distinct airspace surfaces; the Approach Surface, and the Transitional Surface. The slope of the approach surface is 8-to-1 for civil heliports. Approach paths can either be straight or curved to accommodate obstructions and avoidance areas.

See also
 Helicopter deck
 List of countries by number of heliports
 List of helicopter airlines
 List of heliports in Turkey
 List of heliports in Canada
 List of heliports in Singapore
 List of heliports in Washington, D.C.

References

Footnotes

General sources

de Voogt, A.J. 2007. Helidrome Architecture. Rotterdam: 010 Publishers.
ICAO Annex 14 Aerodrome Standards, Aerodrome Design and Operations
ICAO 1995. Heliport Manual. Montreal, Canada: ICAO Publications.
Frost, John B. 1996. British helipads. Chester, UK: Appledore Publications.

External links

UK CAA, CAP 437 Standards for Offshore Helicopter Landing Areas (September 2018)
UK CAA, CAP 1264 Standards for Helicopter Landing Areas at Hospitals (First amendment edition, August 2019)
National Fire Protection Association (NFPA) 418 Standards for Heliports, 2016.
International Fire Code
International Building Code
National EMS Pilots Association Hospital Helipad Safety 
Federal Aviation Administration (FAA) Advisory Circular AC 150/5390-2C - Heliport Design..
Unified Facilities Criteria (UFC) Airfield and Heliport Planning, UFC 3-260-0,1Nov 2008
National Interagency Fire Center PMS 510, Interagency Helicopter Operations Guide, Chapter 8 Helicopter Landing Areas, Feb 2013. 
Helitecnica Light Heliports
Point Lighting Corporation Helipad/Helideck Lighting - Wind Cones - Obstruction Lighting

 
Helicopters
Airports by type